Ramji Thakur is a Sanskrit  poet. He won Sahitya Akademi Award in 2012 for his work Laghupadyahprabandhatrayi.

Early life 
He was born in Phulgama province of Nepal. The Vaishnavic poet Govinda Thakur and his step brother, the famous poet Ruchikar were his ancestors. His gurus included Lakhshminath Jha, V.R.Sharma and Pt.Shobhakant Jayadev Jha.

He completed his Acharya from Bihar Sanskrit Samiti, Patna 1956 with a gold medal. He earned an M.A.in 1960 from Bihar University, Muzaffarpur and Ph.D. in 1981 from Lalit Narayan Mithila University, Darbhanga with the topic: बाणभटस्य रचनासु प्र॓ક્ષIविलास.

Career 
He served as lecturer in Purnima Ramapratap Sanskrit college, Baigani, Darbhanga from 1964 to 1972.

He taught at Maharaj Lakshmi Singh college from 1972 to 1989.

Personal life 
The poet retired from the Sanskrit department of Lalit Narayan Mithila University, Darbhanga.

Books 
KHANDKAAVYAM:-

 Vaidehi padankam 1998
 Radha Viraham 1998
 Prem Rahasyam 2003
 Baneshwari Charitam 2004
 Govind Charitamritam 2005
 Matristanyam 2007

KAAVYAAM

 Geetimadhuri 2009

MUKTKAAVYAM

 Aryavilaasah 2009
 Laghupadyahprabandhatrayi 2010
 Kaavyakoshah 2011
 Paryay Charitam Kavyam 2015
 Amritmanthanam 2016

References

Sanskrit poets
Living people
Year of birth missing (living people)
Recipients of the Sahitya Akademi Award in Sanskrit